Parvarchaeota is a phylum of archaea belonging to the DPANN archaea. They have been discovered in acid mine drainage waters and later in marine sediments. The cells of these organisms are extremely small consistent with small genomes. Metagenomic techniques allow obtaining genomic sequences from non-cultured organisms, which were applied to determine this phylum.

The type species is Candidatus Parvarchaeum acidiphilum.  They have very small cells, around 400-500 nm, and reduced genomes made up of about 1000 genes. A similar-sized archaea that has been found in the same acidic environments is Candidatus Microarcheum, from the phylum Micrarchaeota.

According to the phylogenetic trees Parvarchaeota may be a sister group of Thermoplasmata within Euryarchaeota or belong to DPANN, although it has also been suggested that all the DPANN archaea belong phylogenetically to Euryarchaeota.

Taxonomy
The currently accepted taxonomy is based on the List of Prokaryotic names with Standing in Nomenclature (LPSN) and National Center for Biotechnology Information (NCBI).

 Family "Acidifodinimicrobiaceae" Luo et al. 2020
 Genus "Candidatus Acidifodinimicrobium" Luo et al. 2020
 "Ca. A. mancum" Luo et al. 2020
 Family "Parvarchaeaceae" Rinke et al. 2020
 Genus "Candidatus Parvarchaeum" Baker et al. 2010
 "Ca. P. acidiphilum" Baker et al. 2010
 "Ca. P. paracidiphilum" corrig. Baker et al. 2010

See also
 List of Archaea genera

References 

Archaea